Alexander Laing Brown (1851–1936) was a British Liberal Party politician.

He was elected at the 1886 general election as the member of parliament (MP) for Hawick District of Burghs, defeating the sitting Liberal Unionist MP Sir George Otto Trevelyan. At the 1892 general election, Brown did not stand for re-election to the House of Commons.

His grandson Major William Brown served with the Gilgit Scouts during the final years of the British Raj.

References

External links 

1851 births
1936 deaths
Members of the Parliament of the United Kingdom for Scottish constituencies
Scottish Liberal Party MPs
UK MPs 1886–1892